The National Bank Limited is a private limited bank in Bangladesh. Md Mehmood Husain is the Managing Director and Chief Executive Officer of the bank. 

Currently NBL has carrying their business through its 221 branches & Agri Branches spread all over the country.

History 
National Bank Limited is the first private sector bank fully owned by Bangladeshi nationals. The bank was opened on 28 March 1983 but the first branch at 48, Dilkusha Commercial Area, Dhaka started commercial operation on 23 March 1983. The second branch was opened on 11 May 1983 at Khatungonj, Chittagong.

In 2009, Sikder Group took over ownership and management of National Bank Limited.

In 2015, the under construction office tower of the National Bank Limited in Karwan Bazar collapsed caused a neighboring building and road to suffer a cave in. The bank was accused of not cooperating in the handling of the incident by the Mayor of Dhaka.

In February 2016, National Bank Limited moved to auction of SA Oil Refinery, owned by S. A. Group. National Bank auctioned properties owned by SA Oil Refinery to recover 2.15 billion taka loan. The Bank sued Alam and his wife, Yasmin Alam, who is also chairperson of S.A. Group over the bouncing of a 10 million taka checque. It had sued S.A. Group on 27 March 2016 with Double Mooring Police Station in Chittagong to recover the loan. A Chittagong Court issued a travel ban on the managing director of S.A. Group Shahabuddin Alam.

On 10 May 2020, Briefcase Hannan stole 8 million BDT from a transport of National Bank. National Bank Limited defended Ron Haque Sikder after he was accused of threatening to shot an official of EXIM Bank.

On 10 February 2021, Zainul Haque Sikder, chairman of National Bank Limited, died and Monowara Sikder was elected chairman on 24 February. Bangladesh Bank asked the National Bank Limited to not issue any loans without prior authorization from it in April 2021. It also asked for loan information from the bank. Bangladesh Bank was investigating loans to Desh TV, Rongdhanu Builders (Rongdhanu Group), Rupayan Group, and Shanta Enterprise.  On 6 April, Bangladesh Bank ordered chairman of the bank Monowara Sikder to terminate the managing director of the bank, ASM Bulbul. National Bank Limited provided loans to directors of other bank worth 72.16 billion BDT or 18 per cent of all loans. It had 20.85 billion BDT in defaulted loans and had written of 21.54 billion in bad loans in 2020. Bangladesh Bank asked the National Bank Limited to not disburse loans of more than 100 million BDT. On 29 June, Bangladesh Bank refused to extend the tenure of Rick Haque Sikder as director of National Bank Limited for having defaulted on loans. In September, arrest warrant was issued against owners of Messrs Elias Brothers for embezzling 1.83 billion BDT from National Bank Limited. 

In 2022, National Bank Limited made 3.7 billion BDT in losses. Bangladesh Bank fined National Bank Limited 5.5 million taka after it found the bank was hiding loan and credit cart information on 11 individuals including nine family members of Zainul Haque Sikder. The 11, including Rick Haque Sikder and Ron Haque Sikder, had spent 13.63 million USD using credit cards. Bangladesh Bank also found National Bank operating an illegal foreign currency account of ZH Sikder Women's Medical College. In September, it announced plans to raise 100 million USD through issuing bonds. Bangladesh Bank in October denied Sikder Insurance Company nomination of Mohammad Sayed Ahmed Raza to the board of directors of National Bank. In December 2022, Justice Borhanuddin of the Appellate Division upheld a High Court Division order Anti-Corruption Commission, Criminal Investigation Department, and Bangladesh Financial Intelligence Unit to investigate Ron Haque Sikder and his family members for money laundering using credit cards.

Mehmood Hossain became the managing director of National Bank Limited in January 2023. National Bank took 1.5 billion in emergency loans from Sonali Bank.

Board of directors

References

External links

Banks established in 1983
Banks of Bangladesh